Panagiotis "Panos" Manias (alternate spelling: Panayiotis, 1933 – 10 July 2020) was an international basketball player, track athlete and bridge player from Greece. During his club playing career, he played at the power forward position.

Track and field career
Manias began his career as an athlete competing in track competitions. He competed in both the high jump and the long jump.

Basketball career

Club career
Manias was a member of the Panellinios Basketball Club and its famous 1950s era "Chrysi Pentada", or “The Golden Five” in English. With Panellinios, he won 3 Greek League championships, in the years 1953, 1955, and 1957. He also won two European Club Championships with the club, as he won the 1955 Brussels Basketball Tournament and the 1956 San Remo Basketball Tournament. While he was also a runner-up at the 1954 San Remo Tournament.

National team career
Manias was also a member of the senior men's Greek national basketball team. With Greece, he competed at the following tournaments: the 1951 Mediterranean Games, the 1951 EuroBasket, the 1952 Summer Olympic Games, and the 1955 Mediterranean Games, where he won a bronze medal.

Bridge career
Manias was a member of the Greek bridge national team. He competed at both the 1976 and 1980 editions of the World Team Olympiad.

Death
Manias died in Piraeus, Athens, Greece, on 10 July, 2020, at the age of 87, due to drowning.

References

External links
 Basket.gr 
 Segas.gr 

1933 births
2020 deaths
Basketball players at the 1952 Summer Olympics
Greek Basket League players
Greek men's basketball players
Olympic basketball players of Greece
Panellinios B.C. players
Power forwards (basketball)
Small forwards
Basketball players from Athens
Basketball players at the 1955 Mediterranean Games
Mediterranean Games bronze medalists for Greece
Mediterranean Games medalists in basketball
Contract bridge players